Sher Vancouver is a registered charity in Metro Vancouver, British Columbia , Canada for lesbian, gay, bisexual, transgender, and queer South Asians and their friends.  The full name of the organization is the Sher Vancouver LGBTQ Friends Society.  The society was originally founded as an online Yahoo group for LGBTQ Sikhs in April 2008 by social worker Alex Sangha of Delta, B.C.

About the Name and Logo 
Sher means “lion” in Persian and many South Asian languages.  Sher was chosen as the name because it symbolizes courage, pride, bravery, and strength. In addition, the Sikh name “Singh” for males also means lion and the Sikh name “Kaur” for females means lioness or princess.

The original Sher Vancouver logo which was in use from 2008 to 2018 consisted of a pink circular Lionhead on a white background, and Sher was in bold pink letters and Vancouver in grey.  It was created by local Vancouver graphic designer and illustrator, Jag Nagra.  In April 2018, as Sher Vancouver celebrated its 10th anniversary, Jag Nagra did a full re-brand of Sher Vancouver’s visual identity using a vibrant 2-colour logo paired with an updated icon.

Activities 
Sher Vancouver launched the Dosti project which means friendship in many South Asian languages.  The project was an anti-bullying, racism, homophobia, transphobia and coming out workshop that went into high schools.  The project was launched around a time when there was increased anxiety and racial tension in Vancouver regarding gay bashings by South Asians in the city.

Sher Vancouver also provides free crisis counselling and offers peer support groups.  In April 2018, Sher Vancouver marked its 10th anniversary by hosting the Desi-Q Cultural Celebration in Surrey, B.C.  In April 2020, Sher Vancouver launched a comprehensive legal resource, prepared by Pro Bono Students Canada - UBC Chapter, that provided information on LGBTQ+ friendly lawyer referrals, human rights and discrimination, and safe countries for LGBTQ+ travellers

In 2021, Sher Vancouver launched a BIPOC podcast hosted by two queer South Asian women, Niri and Sharon. The first three guests were Sher Vancouver Founder Alex Sangha, graphic designer and artist Jag Nagra, and the Founder of SUVA Beauty Shaina Azad.

Vancouver Pride Parade 
In 2016, Sher Vancouver Founder Alex Sangha became the first Sikh to become the Grand Marshal of the Vancouver Pride Parade.  In 2017, the Canadian federal defence minister Harjit Sajjan, who himself is a Sikh and wears a turban, danced on the Sher float in the Vancouver Pride Parade.  This sent a message to the Sikh community that LGBTQ people need to be treated with dignity, respect, and equality.

Vancouver Vaisakhi Parade 
In 2017, Sher Vancouver became the first LGBTQ South Asian organization to participate in the Vancouver Vaisakhi Parade.  Sher Vancouver has since participated in the Vancouver Vaisakhi Parade multiple times.

Out and Proud Project 
In 2013, Sher Vancouver launched the Out and Proud Project which profiled LGBTQ South Asians from around the world.

January Marie Lapuz 
January Marie Lapuz (born John Carlo Embo Lapuz; April 9, 1986 – September 30, 2012) was the social coordinator of Sher Vancouver and was the first transgender person to become an Executive member of the organization.

She died of multiple stab wounds in New Westminster, BC due to an altercation with a client over the price of a sexual encounter.  Sher Vancouver wrote to the City of New Westminster advocating for a memorial for January Marie Lapuz.

Youth Leadership Award 
In 2015, Sher Vancouver launched the January Marie Lapuz Youth Leadership Award to recognize youth who are 16 to 30 who demonstrate involvement, commitment, and leadership in the LGBTQ community. Social activist Jaspreet Chahal of Surrey, BC was the inaugural winner in 2015 and South Asian LGBTQ magazine Founder Sukhdeep Singh of India was the winner in 2016. Social activists Prachi Khanna was the winner in 2017, and Shilpa Narayan in 2018, both of Surrey, BC.  Transgender Lebanese journalist and activist Norma Lize of Vancouver was the winner in 2019.  Christopher Nkambwe who founded the African Centre for Refugees in Ontario was the winner in 2020. In 2021, community developer Crecien Bencio of Vancouver became the first Filipino to win the award, which is notable because January Marie Lapuz was also a proud Filipina.

Documentaries 
In 2018, Sher Vancouver released a short documentary film, My Name Was January, which was a tribute and eulogy for January and provided a platform for other trans women of colour to express their issues, challenges, and strengths.  The film was an official selection at the National Screen Institute Online Short Film Festival in Winnipeg, Manitoba and the San Francisco Bay Area Sex Worker Film and Arts Festival.  The documentary has won 14 international awards, and garnered 66 official selections at film festivals around the world.  The film was produced by Sher Vancouver Founder Alex Sangha and Sher Vancouver President Ash Brar and directed by former Kwantlen Polytechnic University Journalism students Elina Gress and Lenee Son.  My Name Was January stars January’s mother Betty Lapuz, and her friends Ash Brar, Alex Sangha, Josh Soronow, Pam Hayer and Velvet Steele, as well as social activists Kelendria Nation and Natasha Adsit.  There is rare footage of January Marie Lapuz herself.

In September 2021, Sher Vancouver released its debut feature-length documentary entitled “Emergence – Out of the Shadows” about the strengths and struggles of gay and lesbian South Asian people and the reactions of their parents.  The film is produced by Alex Sangha and directed by Vinay Giridhar, and stars Alex Sangha, Jaspal Kaur Sangha, Kayden Bhangu, Jag Nagra, Harv Nagra, Avtar Singh Nagra, and Rajwant Kaur Nagra. The film had its World Premiere at Cinema Diverse: The Palm Springs LGBTQ Film Festival where it picked up a Festival Favourite award, and started its festival run in other US festivals such as Out On Film in Atlanta which is an Academy Award qualifying festival and the Chicago South Asian Film Festival where it picked up a Special Mention for Director Vinay Giridhar for Best Feature Documentary. Emergence: Out of the Shadows was also an official selection at Image+Nation in Montreal, Reelworld Film Festival in Toronto, and was the closing night film at both the South Asian Film Festival of Montreal and the Vancouver International South Asian Film Festival where it picked up Best Documentary.  The film was also nominated for three awards at the Vancouver Asian Film Festival including Best Canadian Feature Award, Best Director for Canadian Feature Award, and Best Cinematography for Canadian Feature Award for 2021. Emergence: Out of the Shadows entered the Canadian Screen Awards for Best Feature Documentary and Best Editing for 2022. Emergence: Out of the Shadows had its South Asian Premiere at Reel Desires: Chennai International Queer Film Festival.

Awards 
Sher Vancouver received an award from New West Pride for being “Organization of the Year” for establishing the January Marie Lapuz Youth Leadership Award.  Sher Vancouver Founder Alex Sangha also received the Meritorious Service Medal from Her Excellency the Right Honourable Governor General of Canada Julie Payette for founding Sher Vancouver.

References

External links 
 Official Sher Vancouver Website
 Sher Vancouver Out and Proud Project
 Official My Name Was January Website
 Full Documentary - My Name Was January - National Screen Institute
 Official Emergence - Out of the Shadows Website
 Short Video - History of Sher Vancouver - YouTube
 January Marie Lapuz Youth Leadership Award

LGBT organizations in Canada
South Asian Canadian culture
2008 establishments in British Columbia
Organizations based in Vancouver
LGBT culture in Vancouver